The Dutch Fashion Awards is an annual awards ceremony first organised by the Dutch Fashion Foundation in 2007.

Jury 
An international jury of professionals representing a cross-section of the international fashion industry decide objectively which upcoming Dutch fashion designer they expect is most likely to bring his/her label onto the international market.

Nominations 
Designers eligible to be nominated for the Dutch Fashion Awards need to match the following criteria:

The designer:
 Graduated from a recognised (inter-)national fashion academy.
 Owns the Dutch nationality, or has been living and working in the Netherlands for at least 5 years.
 Runs his or her own registered enterprise.
 Has developed at least five collections under his or her own label.
 Shows a striking talent creating a fashion label with distinguished style and knows to present this convincingly.
 Is nominated by at least 3 members of the Academy of Dutch Fashion Design.
 Has already taken strategic steps onto the international fashion market.

Academy of Dutch Fashion Design 
In order to guarantee an objective and independent vote, the Dutch Fashion Foundation invited a select group of national decision makers and key-players in fashion to serve on the Academy of Dutch Fashion Design. The members of the Academy of Dutch Fashion Design, including the winners of all previous editions of the Dutch Fashion Awards, each listed their individual top 10 of upcoming Dutch fashion designers, resulting in a pre-selection.

The members of the Academy of Dutch Fashion Design are: 
Amsterdam International Fashion Week, Arnhem Fashion Biennale, Dutch Fashion Foundation, Fonds BKVB, HTNK, Intres, Klavers van Engelen, Modefabriek, Modint, Monique van Heist, Prins Bernhard Cultuurfonds, Sjaak Hullekes and the World Fashion Centre.

From an international point of view the honorary member of the international jury then chooses the finalists who will present themselves and their label to the full international jury on the day of the event.

Editions

Dutch Fashion Awards 2010 
The fourth edition of the Dutch Fashion Awards took place at the Grote Kerk in The Hague on 5 November 2010.
 
Nominees: Bas Kosters, Claes Iversen, Conny Groenewegen, Iris van Herpen, Marcha Hüskes

Jury members: Beppe Angiolini, Donald Potard, Mandi Lennard, Mauro Galligari, Mauro Marcos Fabbri

Mercedes-Benz Dutch Fashion Awards 2009 
The third edition of the Mercedes-Benz Dutch Fashion Awards took place at the Grote Kerk in The Hague on 6 November 2009.

Nominees: Jeroen van Tuyl, Iris van Herpen, Sjaak Hullekes, Mada van Gaans, Bas Kosters

Jury members: Beppe Angiolini, Valentina Maggi, Jean Jacques Picart, Marc Gysemans, Wilbert Das

Mercedes-Benz Dutch Fashion Awards 2008 
The second edition of the Mercedes-Benz Dutch Fashion Awards took place at the Beurs van Berlage in Amsterdam on 7 November 2008.

Nominees: Francisco van Benthum, G+N, Percy Irausquin, Jeroen van Tuyl, Monique van Heist, Mada van Gaans, Joline Jolink

Jury members: Christine Ellis, Terron Schaefer, Franck Jacquard, Paul Helbers, Andreina Longhi, Beppe Angiolini

Mercedes-Benz Dutch Fashion Awards 2007 
The first edition of the Mercedes-Benz Dutch Fashion Awards took place at the Beurs van Berlage in Amsterdam on 1 November 2007.

Nominees: Francisco van Benthum, Spijkers en Spijkers, Mada van Gaans, Klavers van Engelen, Jeroen van Tuyl, Jan Taminiau, Daryl van Wouw

Jury members: Maria Luisa Poumaillou, Valentina Maggi, Bernadette Whitmann, Christine Ellis, Cecilia Jesi Ferrari, Barbara Franchin

See also

 List of fashion awards

Sources 
 2007-09-01, Reclameweek, ‘Mercedes is haute couture’
 2007-11-02, NRC Handelsbald, ‘Duo wint Dutch Fashion Award’, Georgette Koning
 2007-11-02, Het Parool, ‘Prijs Mercedes voor mode’
 2008-09-13, Algemeen Dagblad, ‘Samenwerking ter promotie Nederlands modetalent’, Judith Kloppenburg
 2008-11-11, Style.com, ‘Multiple Viktors, Rolfs at Dutch Fashion Awards’, Gudrun Wilcocks, http://www.style.com/stylefile/2008/11/multiple-viktors-rolfs-at-dutch-fashion-awards
 2008-12-01, MOOD magazine, ‘Dutch Fashion Awards help Young designers’
 2009-11-08, De Telegraaf, ‘Creaties Hullekes vallen in de smaak’, Michou Basu
 2009-12-01, INDIE magazine, ‘A touch of Dutch’, Claudia Hubmann
 2010-01-05, Het Parool, ‘Hulp voor starters in de mode’
 2010-11-09, Vogue.com UK, ‘One to watch’, Lauren Milligan, https://web.archive.org/web/20110612024835/http://www.vogue.co.uk/news/daily/101109-iris-van-herpen-wins-award.aspx
 2010-11-16, Milano Finanza, ‘Van Herpen vince l’edizione 2010 del Dutch Fashion Award’, Michela Zio

Further reading/ viewing 
 Dutch Fashion Awards website, http://www.dutchfashionawards.com
 YouTube: ‘Dutch Fashion Foundation – Dutch Fashion Awards 2010’, https://www.youtube.com/watch?v=l2Pt1YVC2GI
 YouTube: ‘Dutch Fashion Foundation – Mercedes-Benz Dutch Fashion Awards 2009’, https://www.youtube.com/watch?v=CND2nCmv1U0
 YouTube: ‘Dutch Fashion Foundation – Mercedes-Benz Dutch Fashion Awards 2008’, https://www.youtube.com/watch?v=t0mvODvq-QM
 YouTube: ‘Dutch Fashion Foundation – Mercedes-Benz Dutch Fashion Awards 2007’, https://www.youtube.com/watch?v=8rEYC4AoTk4

Fashion awards
2007 establishments in the Netherlands
Recurring events established in 2007
Dutch awards
Dutch fashion